Roughest Africa is a 1923 American silent film starring Stan Laurel.

Cast
 Stan Laurel as Prof. Stanislaus Laurello (Big Boss)
 Katherine Grant as Mrs. Laurello
 James Finlayson as Lt. Hans Downe (Little Boss)

See also
 List of American films of 1923
 Stan Laurel filmography

References

External links

1923 films
American silent short films
American black-and-white films
1923 comedy films
1923 short films
Films directed by Ralph Ceder
Silent American comedy films
American comedy short films
1920s American films
1920s English-language films
English-language comedy films